The Muthaiga Country Club is a club in Nairobi, Kenya. It is located in the suburb of Muthaiga, about 15 minutes drive from the city centre.

The Muthaiga Country Club opened on New Year's Eve in 1913, and became a gathering place for the colonial British settlers  in British East Africa, which later became in 1920, the Colony of Kenya.

Founding history 
One of the club's main founders was The Hon Berkeley Cole (1882-1925), an Anglo-Irish aristocrat from Ulster. Cole was a son of The 4th Earl of Enniskillen and was a brother of The Hon Lowry Cole (1881-1929). Berkeley Cole was also the brother-in-law of Hugh, Lord Delamere, effective 'founder' of the White community in Kenya.

Caroline Elkins describes the club as having had a reputation during colonial times as 'the Moulin Rouge of Africa', where the elite 'drank champagne and pink gin for breakfast, played cards, danced through the night, and generally woke up with someone else's spouse in the morning.'

According to Ulf Aschan, "The club had a rule, still in force today, that a member is entitled to damage any loose property as long as he pays double its value."
Today, the club is still frequented by the upper echelons of Kenyan society. In addition to social gatherings, the club offers accommodation.

Many of its members play golf at the nearby Muthaiga Golf Club.

In popular culture 
The Muthaiga Country Club is a setting in the 1942 memoir West With the Night by Beryl Markham. The author described it like this: "'Na Kupa Hati M'zuri' (I Bring You Good Fortune) was, in my time, engraved in the stone of its great fireplace. Its broad lounge, its bar, its dining-room — none so elaborately furnished as to make a rough-handed hunter pause at its door, nor yet so dowdy as to make a diamond pendant swing ill at ease  — were rooms in which the people who made the Africa I knew danced and talked and laughed, hour after hour."

The Muthaiga Country Club features in Ernest Hemingway's novel Islands in the Stream (1970) during events set before WWII

Evelyn Waugh describes the Muthaiga Country Club in his 1931 travel book Remote People (also included in the anthology When the Going Was Good). Whilst Waugh was unable to find accommodation on the premises, he discovered, upon his arrival in Nairobi, to be already a temporary member, as he had been registered by the secretary of the club who knew about his arrival.

Lucinda Riley frequently uses this place in her sixth book of The Seven Sisters called The Sun Sister, as an splendorous club in 1940's.

See also
White Mischief (1987 film)
Out of Africa (memoir, originally published in 1937)
Out of Africa (1985 film)
Happy Valley set
Denys Finch Hatton
Beryl Markham
Bror von Blixen-Finecke

References

"Welcome to Muthaiga Country Club" (website), Muthaiga Country Club, 2003.

Hotels established in 1913
Buildings and structures completed in 1913
1913 establishments in Kenya
Nairobi
Hotels in Kenya